Tyokhtyur (Töxtür) is a rural locality (a selo), the administrative centre of and one of two settlements, in addition to  Bedzhelek, in Zhankhadinsky Rural Okrug of Megino-Kangalassky District in the Sakha Republic, Russia. Its population as of the 2002 Census was 1,269.

References

Notes

Sources
Official website of the Sakha Republic. Registry of the Administrative-Territorial Divisions of the Sakha Republic. Megino-Kangalassky District. 

Rural localities in Megino-Kangalassky District